"Brother and Sister" (also "Little Sister and Little Brother"; German: Brüderchen und Schwesterchen) is a European fairy tale which was, among others, written down by the Brothers Grimm (KHM 11). It is a tale of Aarne–Thompson Type 450. In Russia the story was more commonly known as Sister Alionushka, Brother Ivanushka, and collected by Alexander Afanasyev in his Narodnye russkie skazki.

Origin
The first recorded appearance of Brother and Sister is in Giambattista Basile's Pentamerone around the 17th century. It was written down as the tale of Ninnillo and Nennella. Since then it has circulated in a number of European countries under varying titles but with most of the main story intact. In Russia the story was more commonly known as Sister Alionushka, Brother Ivanushka, and collected by Alexander Afanasyev in his Narodnye russkie skazki.

A shorter version of the tale was published by the Brothers Grimm in the first edition of Kinder- und Hausmärchen in 1812, then substantially expanded and revised in the second edition (1819). Their version is based on the account of the German storyteller Marie Hassenpflug (1788–1856).

At times, Brother and Sister has been confused with Hansel and Gretel, which has also been known under the alternate title of Little Brother and Little Sister. The Grimms selected Hansel and Gretel for the tale by that name and kept the Brother and Sister title for this tale. Some publications of the Hansel and Gretel tale still use the Little Brother and Little Sister title, causing confusion for readers.

Polish folklorist Julian Krzyżanowski suggested that a 1558 Latin language booklet by a Polish author, Christopher Kobylienski, contains a literary treatment of the tale type, about a pair of siblings, the boy becoming a lamb from drinking from "dangerous waters" and the sister marrying a king.

Synopsis
Tired of the cruel mistreatment they endure from their stepmother, who is an evil witch, a brother and sister run away from home, wander off into the countryside, and spend the night in the woods. By morning, the boy is thirsty, so the children go looking for a spring of clear water. However, their stepmother has already discovered their escape and has bewitched all the springs in the forest. The boy is about to drink from one, when his sister hears how its rushing sound says, "whoever drinks from me will become a tiger" (or lion).

Desperately, the girl begs her brother not to drink from the spring, lest he transformed into a tiger and attacked her. So they continue on their way, but when they come to the second spring, the girl hears it say, "whoever drinks from me will become wolf". Again, she desperately tries to prevent her brother from drinking from it. Reluctantly, he eventually agrees to her pleas but insists he drink from the next spring they encounter. And so they arrive at the third spring, and the girl overhears the rushing water cry, "whoever drinks from me will become a deer". But before she could stop her brother, he has already drunk from it, and turned into a deer.

As the initial feeling of despair passes, the children decide to live in the woods forever. The girl takes care of her brother, and ties her gold chain around his neck. They go to live in a little house deep within the woods and live there happily for some years, until they are disturbed one day by a hunting party and the king himself who has followed the strange deer home. Upon seeing the beautiful girl, he immediately asks her to marry him and she accepts. Thus she becomes queen and they all live happily in the king's castle. Time passes and the queen gives birth to a son.

The witch, however, soon discovers that they are still alive, and plots against them. One night, she kills the queen and replaces her with her own disfigured daughter, whom she has transformed to a physical copy of her. When the queen's ghost secretly visits her baby's bedside for three consecutive nights, the king catches on and her stepmother's evil plan is exposed.

The queen comes back to life when the king embraces her, and her stepfamily are tried for their crimes. The witch's daughter is banished into the woods where she is eaten by wild animals, and the wicked stepmother herself is burned at the stake. At the exact moment of the witch's death, the deer becomes human again, and at long last the family is reunited, and they lived happily ever after.

Analysis

Tale type
"Brother and Sister" is similar to other AT-450 tales, such as "The Lambkin and the Little Fish". In some versions the queen is not killed but merely put in a trance by the wicked stepmother until she is awakened by the king. In West-Slavic variants, the reason the siblings escape from home is to thwart a cannibalistic attempt by their parents.

Relation to other tale types
The tale has been noted to contain similarities, among others, to tale types AaTh 403, "The Black and the White Bride"; AaTh 451, "The Seven Ravens"; AaTh 706, "Salvatica"; and AaTh 710, "Our Lady's Child". Hungarian-American folklorist Linda Dégh and Stith Thompson also remarked on the closeness between types 450 and 403.

Variants 
According to folklorist Paul Delarue, the tale type is "very well known in Eastern Europe" but "not widely disseminated in Western Europe". Stith Thompson also located variants in Eastern Europe (Russia, Baltic region and the Balkans), but also across the Near East and into India. Likewise, Lithuanian folklorist Bronislava Kerbelyte claimed that the tale is "popular" in Lithuania and neighbouring countries.

Elsabet Róna-Sklarek also claimed that the story was "sehr beliebten" ("very popular") in Hungary. According to Linda Dégh, the Hungarian Folktale Catalogue registers 48 variants.

Scholars Anna Angelopoulou and Aigle Broskou state that tale type 450 is "widespread" in Greece, with 124 variants recorded.

Lithuanian folklorist , in his analysis of Lithuanian folktales (published in 1936), classified the tale as Avinėliu paverstas berniukas (Jonukas ir Elenytė) ("The Boy Changed to a Lamb (John and Helen)"), with 43 variants registered until then. In these tales, the boy becomes a "silken, fleecy lamb", and, after his sister marries the prince, their step-mother turns her into a duck. Years later, fellow folklorist  reported 133 variants of the tale type in this country.

In his Catalogue of Persian Folktales, German scholar  reports 11 Iranian variants of type 450, "Brüderchen und Schwesterchen" ("Little Brother and Little Sister"), wherein the pair of sibling escape from their evil stepmother or from a div, and the little brother becomes a gazelle by drinking from a water source.

Interpretations

Historical approach
This tale, like The Twelve Brothers, The Seven Ravens, and The Six Swans, features a woman rescuing her brother. In the era and region in which it was collected, many men were drafted by kings for soldiers, to be sent as mercenaries. As a consequence, many men made their daughter their heirs; however, they also exerted more control over them and their marriages as a consequence.  The stories have been interpreted as a wish by women for the return of their brothers, freeing them from this control.  However, the issues of when the stories were collected are unclear, and stories of this type have been found in many other cultures, where this issue can not have inspired them.

Psychological interpretation
Modern psycho-analysis interprets the relation between brother and sister in this story as a metaphor for the animalistic and spiritual duality in humans. The brother represents the instinctive and the sister the rational side. As Brother and Sister opens, the two children are still in their youth and clearly in conflict over each other's choices. The brother cannot control his impulse to drink from the wellspring and is subsequently "punished" by being turned into a deer. Note then the symbolical gesture with which the girl ties her gold chain around her brother's neck, as if to suggest the taming of the animalistic side. Following is a period of relative happiness in which the two sides live in harmony with each other. In this context, Brother and Sister could be viewed as a veiled coming of age tale. In this story the animalistic side is associated with the male and the spiritual/rational side with the female.

It has also been interpreted for messages about family fidelity through adversity and separation.

Adaptations

Television
Nippon Animation Company of Japan featured the story in one episode of season two of its anime television series, Grimm's Fairy Tale Classics. The siblings are given names other than their "titles": Rudolph for the Brother, Rosa for the Sister. Rosa is not murdered by the Witch, but instead is abducted and forcibly taken into a mountain. She uses some sort of bilocation to send out her soul and feed her baby, but it weakens her greatly in the process; her husband the King and his soldiers rescue her right before she withers away. The evil stepsister is omitted from the story, and the Witch dies offscreen rather than being burned at the stake.

A Hungarian variant of the tale was adapted into an episode of the Hungarian television series Magyar népmesék ("Hungarian Folk Tales") (hu), with the title Cerceruska. In this version, the maiden has a little sister who drinks from the pool of water in the woods and is transformed into a deer.

The Russian variant of the tale was adapted into a cartoon in 1953.

Literature
Contemporary literary works that draw upon this fairy tale and its analytical themes include "In the Night Country," a story by Ellen Steiber, "Brother and Sister," a poem by Terri Windling, and "Sister and Brother," a poem by Barth Anderson.

See also

The Wonderful Birch
The Three Little Men in the Wood
The Golden Stag

References
Citations

Bibliography

Further reading
 Ziner, Feenie. "A Lithuanian Folk Tale". In: Children's Literature, vol. 21, 1993, p. 145-152. Project MUSE, doi:10.1353/chl.0.0580.

External links

 

Brother and Sister in Andrew Lang's The Red Fairy Book (1890)

Literary duos
Grimms' Fairy Tales
European fairy tales
Siblings in fiction
Fiction about shapeshifting
Witchcraft in fairy tales
ATU 400-459
False hero